Plywood is a material manufactured from thin layers or "plies" of wood veneer that are glued together with adjacent layers having their wood grain rotated up to 90 degrees to one another. It is an engineered wood from the family of manufactured boards which include medium-density fibreboard (MDF), oriented strand board (OSB) and particle board (chipboard).

All plywoods bind resin and wood fibre sheets (cellulose cells are long, strong and thin) to form a composite material. This alternation of the grain is called cross-graining and has several important benefits: it reduces the tendency of wood to split when nailed at the edges; it reduces expansion and shrinkage, providing improved dimensional stability; and it makes the strength of the panel consistent across all directions.  There is usually an odd number of plies, so that the sheet is balanced—this reduces warping. Because plywood is bonded with grains running against one another and with an odd number of composite parts, it has high stiffness perpendicular to the grain direction of the surface ply. 

Smaller, thinner, and lower quality plywoods may only have their plies (layers) arranged at right angles to each other. Some better-quality plywood products will by design have five plies in steps of 45 degrees (0, 45, 90, 135, and 180 degrees), giving strength in multiple axes.

The word ply derives from the French verb , "to fold", from the Latin verb , from the ancient Greek verb .

History
The ancient Egyptians and Greeks cut wood thinly and glued it together in layers with the grain in perpendicular directions as fine wood was in short supply. This is believed to have been done purely for cosmetic and economical purposes but it turned out to be a great alternative to pure wood as it reduced flex, making it a versatile building material.
 

In 1797 Samuel Bentham applied for patents covering several machines to produce veneers. In his patent applications, he described the concept of laminating several layers of veneer with glue to form a thicker piece – the first description of what we now call plywood.   Bentham was a British naval engineer with many shipbuilding inventions to his credit. Veneers at the time of Bentham were flat sawn, rift sawn or quarter sawn; i.e. cut along or across the log manually in different angles to the grain and thus limited in width and length.

About fifty years later Immanuel Nobel, father of Alfred Nobel, realized that several thinner layers of wood bonded together would be stronger than a single thick layer of wood. Understanding the industrial potential of laminated wood, he invented the rotary lathe.

There is little record of the early implementation of the rotary lathe and the subsequent commercialization of plywood as we know it today, but in its 1870 edition, the French dictionary Robert describes the process of rotary lathe veneer manufacturing in its entry Déroulage.  One can thus presume that rotary lathe plywood manufacturing was an established process in France in the 1860s. Plywood was introduced into the United States in 1865  and industrial production there started shortly after. In 1928, the first standard-sized 4 ft by 8 ft (1.22 m by 2.44 m) plywood sheets were introduced in the United States for use as a general building material.

Artists use plywood as a support for easel paintings to replace traditional canvas or cardboard. Ready-made artist boards for oil painting in three-layered plywood (3-ply) were produced and sold in New York as early as 1880.

Structural characteristics
A typical plywood panel has face veneers of a higher grade than the core veneers. The principal function of the core layers is to increase the separation between the outer layers where the bending stresses are highest, thus increasing the panel's resistance to bending. As a result, thicker panels can span greater distances under the same loads. In bending, the maximum stress occurs in the outermost layers, one in tension, the other in compression. Bending stress decreases from the maximum at the face layers to nearly zero at the central layer. Shear stress, by contrast, is higher in the center of the panel, and at the outer fibres. Within Europe basic plywood can be divided into three main categories: birch plywood (density approx. ), mixed plywood (density approx. ) and conifer plywoods (density 460–).

Types

Different varieties of plywood exist for different applications:

Softwood
Softwood plywood is usually made either of cedar, Douglas fir or spruce, pine, and fir (collectively known as spruce-pine-fir or SPF) or redwood and is typically used for construction and industrial purposes.

Plies vary in thickness from 1.4 mm to 4.3 mm. The number of plies—which is always odd—depends on the thickness and grade of the sheet. Roofing can use the thinner  plywood. Plywood for flooring applications is often tongue and groove (T&G); This prevents one board from moving up or down relative to its neighbor, providing a solid-feeling floor when the joints do not lie over joists. T&G plywood is usually found in the  range.

Hardwood
Hardwood plywood is made out of wood from dicot trees (oak, beech and mahogany) and used for demanding end uses. Hardwood plywood is characterized by its excellent strength, stiffness, durability and resistance to creep. It has a high planar shear strength and impact resistance, which make it especially suitable for heavy-duty floor and wall structures. Oriented plywood construction has a high wheel-carrying capacity. Hardwood plywood has excellent surface hardness, and damage- and wear-resistance.

Tropical
Tropical plywood is made of mixed hardwood species of tropical timber.  Originally from the Asian region, it is now also manufactured in African and South American countries.  Tropical plywood is superior to softwood plywood due to its density, strength, evenness of layers, and high quality.  It is usually sold at a premium in many markets if manufactured with high standards.  Tropical plywood is widely used in the UK, Japan, United States, Taiwan, Korea, Dubai, and other countries worldwide.  It is used for construction purposes in many regions due to its low cost.  However, many countries' forests have been over-harvested, including the Philippines, Malaysia and Indonesia, largely due to the demand for plywood production and export.

Aircraft

High-strength plywood, also known as aircraft plywood, is made from mahogany, spruce and/or birch using adhesives with an increased resistance to heat and humidity. It was used in the construction of air assault gliders during World War II and also several fighter aircraft, most notably the multi-role British Mosquito. Nicknamed "The Wooden Wonder", plywood was used for the wing surfaces, and also flat sections such as bulkheads and the webs of the wing spars. The fuselage had exceptional rigidity from the bonded ply-balsa-ply 'sandwich' of its monocoque shell; elliptical in cross-section, it was formed in two separate mirror-image halves, using curved moulds.

Structural aircraft-grade plywood is most commonly manufactured from African mahogany, spruce or birch veneers that are bonded together in a hot press over hardwood cores of basswood or poplar or from European Birch veneers throughout. Basswood is another type of aviation-grade plywood that is lighter and more flexible than mahogany and birch plywood but has slightly less structural strength. Aviation-grade plywood is manufactured to a number of specifications including those outlined since 1931 in the Germanischer Lloyd Rules for Surveying and Testing of Plywood for Aircraft and MIL-P-607, the latter of which calls for shear testing after immersion in boiling water for three hours to verify the adhesive qualities between the plies meets specifications.

Howard Hughes' H-4 Hercules was constructed of plywood. The plane was built by the Hughes Aircraft Company employing a plywood-and-resin Duramold process. The specialized wood veneer was made by Roddis Manufacturing in Marshfield, Wisconsin.

Decorative (overlaid)
Usually faced with hardwood, including ash, oak, red oak, birch, maple, mahogany, shorea (often called lauan, meranti, or Philippine mahogany, though having no relation to true mahogany), rosewood, teak and a large number of other hardwoods.

Flexible
Flexible plywood is designed for making curved parts, a practice which dates back to the 1850s in furniture making. Wiggle board is often glued together in two layers once it is formed into the desired curve, so that the final shape will be stiff and resist movement. Often, decorative wood veneers are added as a surface layer.

In the United Kingdom single-ply sheets of veneer were used to make stove pipe hats in Victorian times, so flexible modern plywood is sometimes known there as "hatters ply", although the original material was not strictly plywood, but a single sheet of veneer.

Marine
Marine plywood is manufactured from durable face and core veneers, with few defects so it performs longer in both humid and wet conditions and resists delaminating and fungal attack. Its construction is such that it can be used in environments where it is exposed to moisture for long periods. Each wood veneer will be from tropical hardwoods and have negligible core gap, limiting the chance of trapping water in the plywood and hence providing a solid and stable glue bond. It uses an exterior Weather and Boil Proof (WBP) glue similar to most exterior plywoods.

Marine plywood can be graded as being compliant with BS 1088, which is a British Standard for marine plywood and IS:710 is Bureau of Indian Standards (BIS) for marine grade plywood. There are few international standards for grading marine plywood and most of the standards are voluntary. Some marine plywood has a Lloyd's of London stamp that certifies it to be BS 1088 compliant. Some plywood is also labeled based on the wood used to manufacture it. Examples of this are Okoumé or Meranti.

In the UK, one can find builders' merchants advertising a grade of ply as "marine ply" that does not conform to BS 1088 - generally online adverts for these products will include a caveat along the lines of "not suitable for boat

Other
Other types of plywoods include fire-retardant, moisture-resistant, wire mesh, sign-grade, and pressure-treated. However, the plywood may be treated with various chemicals to improve the plywood's fireproofing. Each of these products is designed to fill a need in industry.

Baltic Birch plywood is a product of an area around the Baltic Sea. Originally manufactured for European cabinet makers but now popular in the United States as well. It is very stable composed of an inner void-free core of cross-banded birch plys with an exterior grade adhesive. The face veneers are thicker than traditional cabinet grade

Production 

Plywood production requires a good log, called a peeler, which is generally straighter and larger in diameter than one required for processing into dimensioned lumber by a sawmill. The log is laid horizontally and rotated about its long axis while a long blade is pressed into it, causing a thin layer of wood to peel off (much as a continuous sheet of paper from a roll). An adjustable nosebar, which may be solid or a roller, is pressed against the log during rotation, to create a "gap" for veneer to pass through between the knife and the nosebar. The nosebar partly compresses the wood as it is peeled; it controls vibration of the peeling knife; and assists in keeping the veneer being peeled to an accurate thickness. In this way the log is peeled into sheets of veneer, which are then cut to the desired oversize dimensions, to allow it to shrink (depending on wood species) when dried. The panel can then be patched, have minor surface defects such as splits or small knot holes filled, re-sized, sanded or otherwise refinished, depending on the market for which it is intended.

Plywood for indoor use generally uses the less expensive urea-formaldehyde glue, which has limited water resistance, while outdoor and marine-grade plywood are designed to withstand moisture, and use a water-resistant resorcinol-formaldehyde or phenol-formaldehyde glue to prevent delamination and to retain strength in high humidity.

The adhesives used in plywood have become a point of concern. Both urea formaldehyde and phenol formaldehyde are carcinogenic in very high concentrations. As a result, many manufacturers are turning to low formaldehyde-emitting glue systems, denoted by an "E" rating. Plywood produced to "E0" has effectively zero formaldehyde emissions.

In addition to the glues being brought to the forefront, the wood resources themselves are becoming the focus of manufacturers, due in part to energy conservation, as well as concern for natural resources. There are several certifications available to manufacturers who participate in these programs. Programme for the Endorsement of Forest Certification (PEFC) Forest Stewardship Council (FSC), Leadership in Energy and Environmental Design (LEED), Sustainable Forestry Initiative (SFI), and Greenguard are all certification programs that ensure that production and construction practices are sustainable. Many of these programs offer tax benefits to both the manufacturer and the end user.

Sizes
The sizes of the most commonly used plywood sheets are 4 x 8 feet (1220 x 2440 mm) which was first used by the Portland Manufacturing Company, who developed what we know of as modern veneer core plywood for the 1905 Portland World Fair. A common metric size for a sheet of plywood is 1200 x 2400 mm.  is also a common European size for Baltic birch ply, and aircraft ply.

Grades 
Grading rules differ according to the country of origin. The most popular standards are the British Standard (BS) and the American Standard (ASTM). Joyce (1970), however, list some general indication of grading rules:

Applications 
Plywood is used in many applications that need high-quality, high-strength sheet material. Quality in this context means resistance to cracking, breaking, shrinkage, twisting and warping.

Exterior glued plywood is suitable for outdoor use, but because moisture affects the strength of wood, optimal performance is achieved where the moisture content remains relatively low. Subzero conditions do not affect the dimensional or strength properties of plywood,  making some special applications possible.

Plywood is also used as an engineering material for stressed-skin applications. It has been used for marine and aviation applications since WWII. Most notable is the British de Havilland Mosquito bomber, with a fuselage made of birch plywood sandwiching a balsa core, and using plywood extensively for the wings. Plywood was also used for the hulls in the hard-chine Motor Torpedo Boats (MTB) and Motor Gun Boats (MGB) built by the British Power Boat Company and Vosper's, American PT boats, and the Higgins landing craft critical to the D-Day landings. The American designers Charles and Ray Eames are known for their plywood-based furniture, as is Finnish Architect Alvar Aalto and his firm Artek, while Phil Bolger has designed a wide range of boats built primarily of plywood.

Plywood is often used to create curved surfaces because it can easily bend with the grain. Skateboard ramps often utilize plywood as the top smooth surface over bent curves to create transition that can simulate the shapes of ocean waves.

Softwood plywood
Typical end uses of spruce plywood are:
Floors, walls, and roofs in home constructions
Wind bracing panels
Vehicle internal body work
Packages and boxes
Fencing

There are coating solutions available that mask the prominent grain structure of spruce plywood. For these coated plywoods there are some end uses where reasonable strength is needed but the lightness of spruce is a benefit, e.g.:
Concrete shuttering panels
Ready-to-paint surfaces for constructions

Hardwood plywood
Phenolic resin film coated (Film Faced) hardwood plywood is typically used as a ready-to-install component e.g.:
Panels in concrete form work systems
Floors, walls and roofs in transport vehicles
Container floors
Floors subjected to heavy wear in various buildings and factories
Scaffolding materials

("Wire" or other styles of imprinting available for better traction)

Birch plywood is used as a structural material in special applications e.g.:
Wind turbine blades
Insulation boxes for liquefied natural gas (LNG) carriers

Smooth surface and accurate thickness combined with the durability of the material makes birch plywood a favorable material for many special end uses e.g.:
High-end loud speakers
Die-cutting boards
Supporting structure for parquet
Playground equipment
Furniture
Signs and fences for demanding outdoor advertising
Musical instruments
Sports equipment

Tropical plywood
Tropical plywood is widely available from the South-East Asia region, mainly from Malaysia and Indonesia.

Common plywood
Concrete panel
Floor base
Structure panel
Container flooring
Lamin board
Laminated veneer lumber (LVL)

References

External links 

 
Engineered wood
Composite materials